William Little or Billy Little may refer to:

 William Brian Little (1942–2000), founding partner of Forstmann Little & Company, a private equity firm
 William Carruthers Little (1820–1881), Ontario farmer and political figure
 William H. Little, founder of the Little Motor Car Company 1911–1913
 William John Little (1810–1894), English surgeon who identified cerebral palsy in children
 William Little (Australian poet) (1839–1916), Australian fiction writer and poet
 William Little (Pittsburgh mayor) (1809–1887), politician in Pittsburgh
 William Grady Little (born 1950), former manager of the Boston Red Sox and Los Angeles Dodgers
 William Little (politician) (1840–1902), member of the Queensland Legislative Assembly, Australia
 William McCarty Little (1845–1915), United States Navy officer
 William Nelson Little, court martialed in 1915 on charges of negligence during his inspection of the submarine USS K-2
 Billy Little (born 1940), Scottish footballer
 Billy Little (1900s rugby league), English rugby league footballer who played in the 1930s and 1940s
 Billy Little (rugby league, born 1911) (1911–2004), rugby league footballer who played in the 1930s for England, and Barrow